The 2010 WSBL season was the 22nd season of the Women's State Basketball League (SBL). The regular season began on Friday 12 March and ended on Saturday 17 July. The finals began on Friday 23 July and ended on Friday 20 August, when the Willetton Tigers defeated the Perry Lakes Hawks in the WSBL Grand Final.

Regular season
The regular season began on Friday 12 March and ended on Saturday 17 July after 19 rounds of competition.

Standings

Finals
The finals began on Friday 23 July and ended on Friday 20 August with the WSBL Grand Final.

Bracket

Awards

Player of the Week

Statistics leaders

Regular season
 Most Valuable Player: Kaye Tucker (Rockingham Flames)
 Coach of the Year: Narelle Henry (Perth Redbacks)
 Most Improved Player: Jasmine Hooper (Willetton Tigers)
 All-Star Five:
 PG: Kate Malpass (Willetton Tigers)
 SG: Casey Mihovilovich (Mandurah Magic)
 SF: Kaye Tucker (Rockingham Flames)
 PF: Samantha Norwood (East Perth Eagles)
 C: Marita Payne (Perth Redbacks)

Finals
 Grand Final MVP: Jasmine Hooper (Willetton Tigers)

References

External links
 2010 fixtures
 April Player & Coach of the Month
 May Player & Coach of the Month
 June Player & Coach of the Month

2010
2009–10 in Australian basketball
2010–11 in Australian basketball